Johannes de Cleve (c. 1529 – 14 July 1582) was a composer active at the court of Ferdinand I and Charles II.

He was presumably born in the Duchy of Cleves, and recruited into the court as a choirboy in the same way as Lassus and many others. He was originally a singer in Ferdinand's chapel in Vienna, but when Charles II organized a new chapel in Graz in 1564, he appointed de Cleve as the first Kapellmeister in Graz.

Works
 Laudatory and occasional Latin motets for the Habsburg court.
 'Missa rex Babylonis venit ad lacum.'

References

1529 births
1582 deaths
Renaissance composers
Male classical composers